This is a list of medieval musical instruments as used in European music.

List

References

External links
Zampogne e Ciaramella

Medieval